Jubadeh (also Romanized as Jūbādeh; also known as Jabadeh, Jabbādeh, and Jonnādeh) is a village in Hamzehlu Rural District, in the Central District of Khomeyn County, Markazi Province, Iran. At the 2006 census, its population was 30, in 11 families.

References 

Populated places in Khomeyn County